The Story Without a Name is a 1924 American silent melodrama film directed by Irvin Willat and based on a novel by Arthur Stringer, which was published in conjunction with the film. It was produced by Famous Players-Lasky and distributed by Paramount Pictures and stars Agnes Ayres.  A contest run by Photoplay magazine asked viewers to select a title for the film for a prize of $5,000, with the alternative title Without Warning selected as the winning entry.

A 1952 film noir with the title Without Warning! had a working title of The Story Without a Name, but the plots of the two films are quite different.

Cast

Preservation
With no prints of The Story Without a Name located in any film archives, it is a lost film.

References

External links

Stringer, Arthur (1924), The Story Without a Name, New York: Grosset & Dunlap (with stills), on the Internet Archive

1924 films
American silent feature films
Lost American films
Films directed by Irvin Willat
Films based on Canadian novels
Famous Players-Lasky films
1924 drama films
Silent American drama films
American black-and-white films
Melodrama films
1924 lost films
Lost drama films
1920s American films